A fume hood (sometimes called a fume cupboard or fume closet) is a type of local ventilation device that is designed to limit exposure to hazardous or toxic fumes, vapors or dusts.

Description

A fume hood is typically a large piece of equipment enclosing five sides of a work area, the bottom of which is most commonly located at a standing work height.

Two main types exist, ducted and recirculating (ductless). The principle is the same for both types: air is drawn in from the front (open) side of the cabinet, and either expelled outside the building or made safe through filtration and fed back into the room. This is used to:
 protect the user from inhaling toxic gases (fume hoods, biosafety cabinets, glove boxes)
 protect the product or experiment (biosafety cabinets, glove boxes)
 protect the environment (recirculating fume hoods, certain biosafety cabinets, and any other type when fitted with appropriate filters in the exhaust airstream)
Secondary functions of these devices may include explosion protection, spill containment, and other functions necessary to the work being done within the device.

Fume hoods are generally set back against the walls and are often fitted with infills above, to cover up the exhaust ductwork. Because of their recessed shape they are generally poorly illuminated by general room lighting, so many have internal lights with vapor-proof covers. The front is a sash window, usually in glass, able to move up and down on a counterbalance mechanism. On educational versions, the sides and sometimes the back of the unit are also glass, so that several pupils can look into a fume hood at once. Low air flow alarm control panels are common, see below.

Fume hoods are generally available in 5 different widths; 1000 mm, 1200 mm, 1500 mm, 1800 mm and 2000 mm. The depth varies between 700 mm and 900 mm, and the height between 1900 mm and 2700 mm. These designs can accommodate from one to three operators.

For exceptionally hazardous materials, an enclosed glovebox may be used, which completely isolates the operator from all direct physical contact with the work material and tools. The enclosure may also be maintained at negative air pressure to ensure that nothing can escape via minute air leaks.

Build Materials 

 Mild Steel, Powder Coated - Traditional method of building fume cupboards is from a zinc coated mild steel. Low cost but has corrosion issues over time and high carbon footprint to manufacture. 
 Stainless Steel - Typically used in Radioactive applications or in cleanrooms or Atex environments 
 Polypropylene - Modern build material with a greater durability that traditional type. Lower environmental impact to produce than mild steel or stainless steel.

Liner materials
 Phenolic resin (for general applications)
 Fiber-reinforced plastic (FRP)
 Epoxy resin
Polypropylene (the best material for the majority of applications)
 Square-corner stainless steel (for durability and heat resistance)
 Coved-corner stainless steel (easier to decontaminate, for radiochemical and biohazard applications)
 Cement board (for rough usage)

Control panels
Most fume hoods are fitted with a mains-powered control panel. Typically, they perform one or more of the following functions:

 Warn of low air flow
 Warn of too large an opening at the front of the unit (a "high sash" alarm is caused by the sliding glass at the front of the unit being raised higher than is considered safe, due to the resulting air velocity drop)
 Allow switching the exhaust fan on or off
 Allow turning an internal light on or off

Specific extra functions can be added, for example, a switch to turn a waterwash system on or off.

Ducted fume hoods

Most fume hoods for industrial purposes are ducted. A large variety of ducted fume hoods exist. In most designs, conditioned (i.e. heated or cooled) air is drawn from the lab space into the fume hood and then dispersed via ducts into the outside atmosphere.

The fume hood is only one part of the lab ventilation system.  Because recirculation of lab air to the rest of the facility is not permitted, air handling units serving the non-laboratory areas are kept segregated from the laboratory units. To improve indoor air quality, some laboratories also utilize single-pass air handling systems, wherein air that is heated or cooled is used only once prior to discharge. Many laboratories continue to use return air systems to the laboratory areas to minimize energy and running costs, while still providing adequate ventilation rates for acceptable working conditions. The fume hoods serve to evacuate hazardous levels of contaminant.

To reduce lab ventilation energy costs, variable air volume (VAV) systems are employed, which reduce the volume of the air exhausted as the fume hood sash is closed. This product is often enhanced by an automatic sash closing device, which will close the fume hood sash when the user leaves the fume hood face. The result is that the hoods are operating at the minimum exhaust volume whenever no one is actually working in front of them.

Since the typical fume hood in US climates uses 3.5 times as much energy as a home, the reduction or minimization of exhaust volume is strategic in reducing facility energy costs as well as minimizing the impact on the facility infrastructure and the environment. Particular attention must be paid to the exhaust discharge location, to reduce risks to public safety, and to avoid drawing exhaust air back into the building air supply system.

Auxiliary air
This method is outdated technology. The premise was to bring non-conditioned outside air directly in front of the hood so that this was the air exhausted to the outside. This method does not work well when the climate changes as it pours frigid or hot and humid air over the user making it very uncomfortable to work or affecting the procedure inside the hood. This system also uses additional ductwork which can be costly.

Constant air volume (CAV)
In a survey of 247 lab professionals conducted in 2010, Lab Manager Magazine found that approximately 43% of fume hoods are conventional CAV fume hoods.

Non-bypass CAV

Closing the sash on a non-bypass CAV hood will increase face velocity (inflow velocity or "pull"), which is a function of the total volume divided by the area of the sash opening. Thus, a conventional hood's performance (from a safety perspective) depends primarily on sash position, with safety increasing as the hood is drawn closed. To address this issue, many conventional CAV hoods specify a maximum height that the fume hood can be open in order to maintain safe airflow levels.

A major drawback of conventional CAV hoods is that when the sash is closed, velocities can increase to the point where they disturb instrumentation and delicate apparatuses, cool hot plates, slow reactions, and/or create turbulence that can force contaminants into the room.

Bypass CAV

Bypass CAV hoods (which are sometimes also referred to as conventional hoods) were developed to overcome the high velocity issues that affect conventional fume hoods. These hood allows air to be pulled through a "bypass" opening from above as the sash closes. The bypass is located so that as the user closes the sash, the bypass opening gets larger. The air going through the hood maintains a constant volume no matter where the sash is positioned and without changing fan speeds. As a result, the energy consumed by CAV fume hoods (or rather, the energy consumed by the building HVAC system and the energy consumed by the hood's exhaust fan) remains constant, or near constant, regardless of sash position.

Low flow/high performance bypass CAV
"High-performance" or "low-flow" bypass CAV hoods are the newest type of bypass CAV hoods and typically display improved containment, safety, and energy conservation features. Low-flow/high performance CAV hoods generally have one or more of the following features: sash stops or horizontal-sliding sashes to limit the openings; sash position and airflow sensors that can control mechanical baffles; small fans to create an air-curtain barrier in the operator's breathing zone; refined aerodynamic designs and variable dual-baffle systems to maintain laminar (undisturbed, nonturbulent) flow through the hood. Although the initial cost of a high-performance hood is typically more than that of a conventional bypass hood, the improved containment and flow characteristics allow these hoods to operate at a face velocity as low as 60 fpm, which can translate into $2,000 per year or more in energy savings, depending on hood size and sash settings.

Reduced air volume (RAV)
Reduced air volume hoods (a variation of low-flow/high performance hoods) incorporate a bypass block to partially close off the bypass, reducing the air volume and thus conserving energy. Usually, the block is combined with a sash stop to limit the height of the sash opening, ensuring a safe face velocity during normal operation while lowering the hood's air volume. By reducing the air volume, the RAV hood can operate with a smaller blower, which is another cost-saving advantage.

Since RAV hoods have restricted sash movement and reduced air volume, these hoods are less flexible in what they can be used for and can only be used for certain tasks. Another drawback to RAV hoods is that users can in theory override or disengage the sash stop. If this occurs, the face velocity could drop to an unsafe level. To counter this condition, operators must be trained never to override the sash stop while in use, and only to do so when loading or cleaning the hood.

Variable air volume (VAV)

VAV hoods, the newest generations of laboratory fume hoods, vary the volume of room air exhausted while maintaining the face velocity at a set level. Different VAV hoods change the exhaust volume using different methods, such as a damper or valve in the exhaust duct that opens and closes based on sash position, or a blower that changes speed to meet air-volume demands. Most VAV hoods integrate a modified bypass-block system that ensures adequate airflow at all sash positions. VAV hoods are connected electronically to the laboratory building's HVAC, so hood exhaust and room supply are balanced. In addition, VAV hoods feature monitors and/or alarms that warn the operator of unsafe hood-airflow conditions.

Although VAV hoods are much more complex than traditional constant-volume hoods, and correspondingly have higher initial costs, they can provide considerable energy savings by reducing the total volume of conditioned air exhausted from the laboratory. Since most hoods are operated the entire time a laboratory is open, this can quickly add up to significant cost savings. These savings are, however, completely contingent on user behavior: the less the hoods are open (both in terms of height and in terms of time), the greater the energy savings. For example, if the laboratory's ventilation system uses 100% once-through outside air and the value of conditioned air is assumed to be $7 per CFM per year (this value would increase with very hot, cold or humid climates), a 6-foot VAV fume hood at full open for experiment set up 10% of the time (2.4 hours per day), at 18 inch working opening 25% of the time (6 hours per day), and completely closed 65% of the time (15.6 hours per day) would save approximately $6,000 every year compared to a hood that is fully open 100% of the time.

Potential behavioral savings from VAV fume hoods are highest when fume hood density (number of fume hoods per square foot of lab space) is high. This is because fume hoods contribute to the achievement of lab spaces' required air exchange rates. Put another way, savings from closing fume hoods can only be achieved when fume hood exhaust rates are greater than the air exchange rate needed to achieve the required ventilation rate in the lab room. For example, in a lab room with a required air exchange rate of 2000 cubic feet per minute (CFM), if that room has just one fume hood which vents air at a rate of 1000 square feet per minute, then closing the sash on the fume hood will simply cause the lab room's air handler to increase from 1000 CFM to 2000 CFM, thus resulting in no net reduction in air exhaust rates, and thus no net reduction in energy consumption.

In a survey of 247 lab professionals conducted in 2010, Lab Manager Magazine found that approximately 12% of fume hoods are VAV fume hoods.

Canopy fume hoods
Canopy fume hoods, also called exhaust canopies, are similar to the range hoods found over stoves in commercial and some residential kitchens. They have only a canopy (and no enclosure and no sash) and are designed for venting non-toxic materials such as non-toxic smoke, steam, heat, and odors. In a survey of 247 lab professionals conducted in 2010, Lab Manager Magazine found that approximately 13% of fume hoods are ducted canopy fume hoods.

Ductless (recirculating) fume hoods
These units generally have a fan mounted on the top (soffit) of the hood, or beneath the worktop. Air is sucked through the front opening of the hood and through a filter, before passing through the fan and being fed back into the workplace. With a ductless fume hood it is essential that the filter medium be able to remove the particular hazardous or noxious material being used. As different filters are required for different materials, recirculating fume hoods should only be used when the hazard is well known and does not change. Ductless Hoods with the fan mounted below the work surface are not recommended as the majority of vapours rise and therefore the fan will have to work a lot harder (which may result in an increase in noise) to pull them downwards. Units with the fan mounted above the work surface have been proven to offer greater levels of safety.

Air filtration of ductless fume hoods is typically broken into two segments:
 Pre-filtration: This is the first stage of filtration, and consists of a physical barrier, typically open cell foam, which prevents large particles from passing through. Filters of this type are generally inexpensive, and last for approximately six months depending on usage.
 Main filtration: After pre-filtration, the fumes are sucked through a layer of activated charcoal which absorbs the majority of chemicals that pass through it. Ammonia and carbon monoxide will, however, pass through most carbon filters. Additional specific filtration techniques can be added to combat chemicals that would otherwise be pumped back into the room. A main filter will generally last for approximately two years, dependent on usage.

Ductless fume hoods are sometimes not appropriate for research applications where the activity, and the materials used or generated, may change or be unknown. As a result of this and other drawbacks, some research organizations, including the University of Wisconsin, Milwaukee, Columbia University, Princeton University, the University of New Hampshire, and the University of Colorado, Boulder either discourage or prohibit the use of ductless fume hoods.

A benefit of ductless fume hoods is that they are mobile, easy to install since they require no ductwork, and can be plugged into a 120 volt or 240 volt outlet.

In a survey of 247 lab professionals conducted in 2010, Lab Manager Magazine found that approximately 22% of fume hoods are ductless fume hoods.

Specialty designs

Acid digestion
These units are typically constructed of polypropylene to resist the corrosive effects of acids at high concentrations. If hydrofluoric acid is being used in the hood, the hood's transparent sash should be constructed of polycarbonate which resists etching better than glass. Hood ductwork should be lined with polypropylene or coated with PTFE (Teflon).

Downflow
Downflow fume hoods, also called downflow work stations, are typically ductless fume hoods designed to protect the user and the environment from hazardous vapors generated on the work surface. A downward air flow is generated and hazardous vapors are collected through slits in the work surface.

Perchloric acid
These units feature a waterwash system (not to be confused with a scrubber - see below) in the ductwork.  Because dense perchloric acid fumes settle and form explosive crystals, it is vital that the internal baffles of the fume cupboard and ductwork be cleaned internally with a series of sprayers.

Radioisotope
This fume hood is made with a coved stainless steel liner and coved integral stainless steel countertop that is reinforced to handle the weight of lead bricks or blocks.

Scrubber
This type of fume hood absorbs the fumes through a chamber filled with plastic shapes (Pall Rings), which are doused with a scrubbing medium.  The chemicals are washed into a sump, which is often filled with a neutralizing liquid such as caustic soda.  The fumes are then dispersed, or disposed of, in the conventional manner.

Waterwash
These fume hoods have an internal wash system that cleans the interior of the unit, to prevent a build-up of dangerous chemicals.

Energy consumption
Because fume hoods constantly remove very large volumes of conditioned (heated or cooled) air from lab spaces, they are responsible for the consumption of large amounts of energy. Energy costs for a typical hood range from $4,600/year for moderate climates such as Los Angeles, to $9,300/year for extreme cooling climates such as Singapore. Fume hoods are a major factor in making laboratories four to five times more energy intensive than typical commercial buildings.  The bulk of the energy that fume hoods are responsible for is the energy needed to heat and/or cool air delivered to the lab space. Additional electricity is consumed by fans in the HVAC system and fans in the fume hood exhaust system.

A number of universities run or have run programs to encourage lab users to reduce fume hood energy consumption by keeping VAV sashes closed as much as possible. For example, Harvard University's Chemistry & Chemical Biology Department ran a "Shut the sash" campaign, which resulted in a sustained ~30% reduction in fume hood exhaust rates. This translated into cost savings of approximately $180,000 per year, and a reduction in annual greenhouse gas emissions equivalent to 300 metric tons of carbon dioxide.  Other institutions reporting programs to reduce energy consumption by fume hoods include Massachusetts Institute of Technology, North Carolina State University, University of British Columbia, University of California, Berkeley, University of California, Davis, University of California, Irvine, University of California, Los Angeles, University of California, Riverside, University of California, San Diego, University of California, Santa Barbara, University of Central Florida and University of Colorado, Boulder.

Newer person detection technology can sense the presence of a hood operator within a zone in front of a hood.  Zone presence sensor signals allow ventilation valve controls to switch between normal and stand by modes.  Coupled with laboratory space occupancy sensors these technologies can adjust ventilation to a dynamic performance objective.

Maintenance

Fume hood maintenance can involve daily, periodic, and annual inspections:

Daily fume hood inspection
The fume hood area is visually inspected for storage of material and other visible blockages.
Periodic fume hood function inspection
Capture or face velocity is typically measured with a velometer or anemometer. Face velocity readings should not vary by more than 20%. A minimum of six readings may be used determine average face velocity.
Other local exhaust devices are smoke tested to determine if the contaminants they are designed to remove are being adequately captured by the hood.
Annual maintenance
Exhaust fan maintenance, (i.e. lubrication, belt tension, fan blade deterioration and rpm), is performed in accordance with the manufacturer's recommendation, or as adjusted for appropriate hood function.
Safety & Energy Upgrades to be performed by professionals as required from time to time to be compliant.

History 

The need for ventilation has been apparent from early days of chemical research and education.  Some early approaches to the problem were adaptations of the conventional chimney. A hearth constructed by Thomas Jefferson in 1822–1826 at the University of Virginia was equipped with a sand bath and special flues to vent toxic gases.

In 1904 the newbuilt Chemical Faculty at the Technical University in Gdańsk was equipped with fume hoods made of wood and glass in auditoria, several lecture rooms, student laboratories and rooms for scientists. Sliding up and down front panel with glass protected from fumes and explosions. Each fume hood was illuminated, equipped with gas installation for heating and running water with a drain. Harmful and corrosive gaseous byproducts of reactions were actively removed using the natural draft of a fireplace chimney. This early design is still functioning after over 110 years.

The draft of a chimney was also used by Thomas Edison as what has been called the "first fume hood".  The first known modern "fume cupboard" design with rising sashes was introduced at the University of Leeds in 1923.

Modern fume hoods are distinguished by methods of regulating air flow independently of combustion, improving efficiency and potentially removing volatile chemicals from exposure to flame. Fume hoods were originally manufactured from wood, but during the 1970s and 1980s epoxy powder-coated steel became the norm. During the 1990s, wood pulp derivatives treated with phenolic resin (plastic laminates and solid grade laminates) for chemical resistance and flame spread retardance started to become widely accepted.

See also
Biosafety cabinet
ECO Funnel
Laminar flow cabinet
Vented balance safety enclosure

Notes

References

External links
Northwestern University Office for Research Safety - The Chemical Fume Hood Handbook
Lab Manager Magazine: CAV, RAV & VAV
University of Louisville's Chemical Hood User's Guide
Information from the University of Bath in the UK
The Fume Hood Resource Center by Lab Manager Magazine
University of Toronto's Guide to running a sash-shutting campaign
What is VAV and Why is It Important? - TION Article 

Laboratory equipment
Ventilation